Manuel Consiglieri (born 15 November 1915, date of death unknown) was a Peruvian athlete. He competed in the men's discus throw at the 1948 Summer Olympics.

References

External links
 

1915 births
Year of death missing
Athletes (track and field) at the 1948 Summer Olympics
Peruvian male discus throwers
Olympic athletes of Peru